The 1995 South African Open was a men's tennis tournament played on hard courts. It was the 90th edition of the South African Open (and the last to take place until 2009), and was part of the ATP World Series of the 1995 ATP Tour. It took place in Johannesburg, South Africa from 3 April through 9 April 1995. Martin Sinner won the singles title.

Finals

Singles
 Martin Sinner defeated  Guillaume Raoux, 6–1, 6–4

Doubles
 Rodolphe Gilbert /  Guillaume Raoux defeated  Martin Sinner /  Joost Winnink, 6–4, 3–6, 6–3

References

External links
 ITF tournament edition details

South African Open (tennis)
Johannesburg
Open
Sports competitions in Johannesburg
1990s in Johannesburg
April 1995 sports events in Africa